Sedentarization of Kurdish tribes was a policy pursued by the Ottoman Empire, its successor Turkey, as well as Iran in the nineteenth and twentieth centuries, in order to limit the movement of nomadic Kurds.

See also
Sedentism

References

Nomadic groups in Eurasia
19th century in the Ottoman Empire
20th century in the Ottoman Empire
20th century in Iran